Jaroslav Krejčí (27 June 1892, Konice, Margraviate of Moravia – 18 May 1956) was a Czech lawyer and Nazi collaborator. He served as the prime minister of the Protectorate of Bohemia and Moravia from 28 September 1941 to 19 January 1945.

After graduating from the Faculty of Law of Charles University in 1915 he worked in the civil service in various positions. During the 1930s he also lectured on constitutional law at Masaryk University (from 1938 as professor).

From 12 December 1938 to 3 March 1939 he was minister of justice in Rudolf Beran's government of the Czechoslovak Second Republic and head of the Czechoslovak Constitutional Court. He served as minister of justice in all Protectorate of Bohemia and Moravia governments and temporarily he was also minister of agriculture. From 28 September 1941 to 19 January 1945 he was prime minister, replacing Alois Eliáš, who had supported the underground resistance to Nazis and was executed. Krejčí was a close friend of president Emil Hácha. Krejčí and his government fully cooperated with the Germans. The most infamous member of his government was Emanuel Moravec, a symbol of Czech collaboration with the Nazis. After the war, Krejčí was sentenced to a 25-year prison term and subsequently died while in prison.

Wolf Gruner wrote that Krejčí "enthusiastically paid homage to Nazi rule".

His son, Jaroslav Krejčí (1916–2014), was a Czech lawyer, sociologist, and professor at Lancaster University in the United Kingdom.

References

External links
  Biography on webpage of Czech government
  Members of Krejčí's government, 19.1.1942 - 19.1.1945
 

1892 births
1956 deaths
People from Konice
People from the Margraviate of Moravia
Government ministers of Czechoslovakia
Prime Ministers of the Protectorate of Bohemia and Moravia
Legal writers
Czech collaborators with Nazi Germany
Czech fascists
Czech anti-communists
Academic staff of Masaryk University
Czechoslovak people who died in prison custody
Prisoners who died in Czechoslovak detention
National Partnership politicians